H. niger may refer to:
 Helleborus niger, the Christmas rose or black hellebore, a plant species
 Hemiargyra niger, a tachinid fly species
 Hyoscyamus niger, the henbane or stinking nightshade, a plant species found in Eurasia
 Hippotragus niger, the sable antelope, a mammal species found in the wooded savannah in East Africa

See also
 Niger (disambiguation)